The following is a list of courts and tribunals in Western Australia:

Courts
Coroner's Court of Western Australia
District Court of Western Australia
Magistrates Court of Western Australia
Supreme Court of Western Australia
Western Australia Industrial Relations Commission
Industrial Magistrates Court
Children's Court of Western Australia
Family Court of Western Australia
Drug courts
Liquor Licensing Court
Aboriginal Community Court
Family Violence Court

Tribunals
Criminal Injuries Compensation Assessor of Western Australia
State Administrative Tribunal of Western Australia
Strata Titles Referee of Western Australia
Town Planning Appeal Tribunal of Western Australia
Western Australian Information Commissioner

Western Australia
Courts